Anatomy of a Ghost was an American emo band from Portland, Oregon, some of whose members originally hailed from Alaska.

History
Anatomy of a Ghost formed early in 2002 and gained popularity through live performances and through internet promotional channels. In 2003 they toured the United States with Saosin and Boys Night Out. Their debut (and only) record, Evanesce, was released in October 2003 on Fearless Records. Despite a warm critical reception, the group broke up in May 2004. The group reunited briefly in 2005 to put together a new album, but the project never materialized. In the meantime, John Gourley and Zach Carothers began playing in the group Portugal. The Man, and Dewey Halpaus had started a group called The Burning Room. Prior to forming Anatomy of a Ghost, Dewey Halpaus, and brothers Nick and Joe Simon were in a band called Nice Guy Eddie.

Members
John Gourley - vocals
Nick Simon - drums
Zachary Carothers - bass
Joe Simon - guitar
Dewey Halpaus - guitar

Discography
Studio albums
Evanesce (Fearless Records, 2003)

References

Musical groups established in 2002
Musical groups disestablished in 2004
American emo musical groups
American screamo musical groups
Fearless Records artists
Musical groups from Portland, Oregon
2002 establishments in Oregon
2004 disestablishments in Oregon